A phase portrait is a geometric representation of the trajectories of a dynamical system in the phase plane. Each set of initial conditions is represented by a different curve, or point.

Phase portraits are an invaluable tool in studying dynamical systems. They consist of a plot of typical trajectories in the state space. This reveals information such as whether an attractor, a repellor or limit cycle is present for the chosen parameter value. The concept of topological equivalence is important in classifying the behaviour of systems by specifying when two different phase portraits represent the same qualitative dynamic behavior. An attractor is a stable point which is also called "sink". The repeller is considered as an unstable point, which is also known as "source".

A phase portrait graph of a dynamical system depicts the system's trajectories (with arrows) and stable steady states (with dots) and unstable steady states (with circles) in a state space. The axes are of state variables.

Examples

Simple pendulum, see picture (right).
Simple harmonic oscillator where the phase portrait is made up of ellipses centred at the origin, which is a fixed point.
Van der Pol oscillator see picture (bottom right).
 Parameter plane (c-plane) and Mandelbrot set

Visualizing the behavior of ordinary differential equations  
A phase portrait represents the directional behavior of a system of ordinary differential equations (ODEs). The phase portrait can indicate the stability of the system. 

The phase portrait behavior of a system of ODEs can be determined by the eigenvalues or the trace and determinant (trace = λ1 + λ2, determinant = λ1 x λ2) of the system.

See also 
Phase space
Phase plane

References

 Chapter 1.

External links
 Linear Phase Portraits, an MIT Mathlet.

Dynamical systems
Diagrams